The Shooting Stars competition was a National Basketball Association (NBA) contest during All-Star Weekend that was held on the Saturday before the All-Star Game.  It involved a current NBA player, a WNBA player, and a retired NBA player competing together in a shooting competition. From 2004 to 2012, players represented their teams' cities. Starting in 2013, the NBA player chose both a WNBA player and the retired player to compete on his team. The competition itself was time based, involving shooting from four locations of increasing difficulty and making all four shots in sequential order. The first shot was a 10-ft bank shot from the right angle, the second was straight-on jump shot from the top of the key, the third was an NBA three-point shot from the left angle and the fourth is a half-court shot. There was a two-minute time limit for each attempt and the top two times advanced to a head-to-head final round. The event was held each All-Star Weekend from 2003–04. In 2007–08, Team San Antonio became the event's first two-time winner. Detroit followed suit in 2008–09 with their second title. In 2005–06, Team San Antonio set the course record with 25.1 seconds. In 2010-11, Team Atlanta became the first team to win the event with a time over one minute. From 2013-15, Team Bosh became the first back-to-back and three time winner. Starting with the 2016 NBA All-Star Game, the contest has been retired and removed from All Star Weekend.

Shooting Stars champions
2015 : Team Bosh (Miami Heat/New York Liberty/Atlanta Hawks): Chris Bosh, Swin Cash, Dominique Wilkins (57.6 seconds)
2014 : Team Bosh (Miami Heat/Chicago Sky/Atlanta Hawks): Chris Bosh, Swin Cash, Dominique Wilkins (31.4 seconds)
2013 : Team Bosh (Miami Heat/Chicago Sky/Atlanta Hawks): Chris Bosh, Swin Cash, Dominique Wilkins (89.0 seconds)
2012 : New York: Landry Fields, Cappie Pondexter, Allan Houston (37.3 seconds)
2011 : Atlanta: Al Horford, Coco Miller, Steve Smith (70.0 seconds)
2010 : Texas (Dallas/Houston/San Antonio): Dirk Nowitzki, Becky Hammon, Kenny Smith (34.3 seconds)
2009 : Detroit: Arron Afflalo, Katie Smith, Bill Laimbeer (58.4 seconds)
2008 : San Antonio: Tim Duncan, Becky Hammon, David Robinson (35.8 seconds)
2007 : Detroit: Chauncey Billups, Swin Cash, Bill Laimbeer  (50.5 seconds)
2006 : San Antonio: Tony Parker, Kendra Wecker, Steve Kerr  (25.1 seconds)
2005 : Phoenix: Shawn Marion, Diana Taurasi, Dan Majerle  (28 seconds)
2004 : Los Angeles (Lakers): Derek Fisher, Lisa Leslie, Magic Johnson  (43.9 seconds)

Other finishers
2015 : 2. Team Westbrook, 3. Team Curry, 4. Team Millsap
2014 : 2. Team Durant, 3. Team Curry, 4. Team Hardaway
2013 : 2. Team Westbrook, 3. Team Harden, 4. Team Lopez
2012 : 2. Texas (HOU/SA), 3. Atlanta, 4. Orlando
2011 : 2. Texas (DAL/HOU/SA), 3. Los Angeles, 4. Chicago
2010 : 2. Los Angeles (Clippers/Lakers), 3. Sacramento, 4. Atlanta
2009 : 2. Phoenix, 3. San Antonio, 4. Los Angeles (Lakers)
2008 : 2. Chicago, 3. Phoenix, 4. Detroit
2007 : 2. Chicago, 3. San Antonio, 4. Los Angeles (Lakers)
2006 : 2. Los Angeles (Lakers), 3. Houston, 4. Phoenix
2005 : 2. Denver, 3. Detroit, 4. Los Angeles (Lakers)
2004 : 2. San Antonio, 3. Los Angeles (Clippers), 4. Detroit

Appearances/Titles
Most Appearances

Most Titles

References

External links

2012 Shooting Stars
2011 Shooting Stars
2010 Shooting Stars
2009 Shooting Stars
2008 Shooting Stars
2007 Shooting Stars
2006 Shooting Stars
2005 Shooting Stars
2004 Shooting Stars

Shooting Stars Competition
Recurring sporting events established in 2004
Recurring sporting events disestablished in 2015
2004 establishments in the United States
2015 disestablishments in the United States